Kwabena Frimpong-Boateng   (born 1949) is a Ghanaian physician and cardiothoracic surgeon who established the National Cardiothoracic Center and the Ghana Red Cross Society. He is also the president of the Ghana Heart Foundation and was the chief executive officer of Korle-Bu Teaching Hospital in Accra.

A well-known figure in his country, Frimpong-Boateng was elected a Fellow of the Ghana Academy of Arts and Sciences in December 2002.

Career 
Frimpong-Boateng attended Sekondi College in Ghana. The young Frimpong-Boateng studied physics and mathematics thinking that he would become an engineer. Nonetheless, he later decided to seek a career as a doctor when he was offered a scholarship to study medicine in Germany. His father Kofi Frimpong had died from heart injuries due to a road traffic accident prior to his birth so he thought he could help people in similar situations. After finishing his post-graduate studies, he returned to his birthplace to practice as Ghana's first locally based cardiothoracic surgeon. He served as the Minister of Environment, Science, Technology and Innovation from 2017 to 2021

In 1992, he set up the National Cardiothoracic Centre at Korle-Bu Teaching Hospital. There were no cardiothoracic surgery facilities in the country at the time, so he aimed the centre to teach to young surgeons and assist new patients. In Ghana, primary health care issues such as malaria and limited childhood vaccinations are greatly underserved due to lack of infrastructure, lack of funding, transportation, and quality and safety, making skilled specialty care a luxury often attained only by those rich enough to leave the country. 

He joined the University of Ghana Medical School as a lecturer in 2000 and was promoted associate professor the same year. He was made a full professor in 2002. He also served as the head of the department of surgery at the University of Ghana Medical School, prior to his current appointment as the chief executive of Korle-Bu Teaching Hospital in 2002. He was elected to the Ghana Academy of Arts and Sciences in December 2002 and gave his inaugural lecture the following year. Frimpong-Boateng also runs a charitable foundation, the Ghana Heart Foundation, which is responsible for paying for heart surgery for some indigent Ghanaians under his care.

Politics

In March 2006, Frimpong-Boateng announced his intention to seek the nomination as the candidate of the New Patriotic Party (NPP) for the December 2008 National Presidential Elections. Documentaries were made about his life and his hopes, but at the end, the candidate elected was Nana Akuffo-Addo.

Regardless of his results, he declared he is still concerned with political issues in relation to education and health problems. He would later regret that political corruption in Ghana was too much and said that in his opinion politicians were not taking social priorities into account, especially the need of technology.

Current involvements 
Frimpong-Boateng spoke at the just ended World Summit Awards Grand Jury held in Accra, Ghana held from 3 November 2018 to 7 November 2018. He mentioned his confidence in digital transformation for growth in the country.

Achievements
 1992 – Established the National Cardio Thoracic Centre which is now recognised by the West African College of Surgeons to train heart surgeons, cardiologists, cardiac anaesthetists, operating room nurses, intensive care nurses, cardiac technicians, and other cardiothoracic technicians.(1992)
 Performed the first open-heart surgery in Ghana using the heart-lung-machine.
 Established the Ghana Heart Foundation to raise funds to assist those who cannot afford the cost of heart surgery.
 1999 – Chartered Institute of Marketing, Ghana (CIMG) Marketing Man of the Year.
 10 September 2004 – Honorary Doctor of Science degree from the University of Education, Winneba.

Awards
 Certificate of appreciation from Orphanage International Ministry in recognition of humanitarian service to Cardio Centre at Korle-Bu Teaching Hospital and to society in Ghana at large especially orphan children 27 July 2002.
 Recognition award from Soviet (CIS) trained doctors association for devoted and meritorious service to Ghana, 5 December 2001.
 Certificate of Distinction from Sapphire Ghana Ltd. For outstanding contribution to National Development, August 1999.
 Award from Enterprise Insurance Company, Ghana in recognition of efforts, achievements, perseverance and success, 1999.
 Millennium Excellence Award Recipient as personality of the decade, December 1999.
 Chartered Institute of Marketing, Ghana, Marketing Man of the Year 1999.
 Co-recipient of the 2003 special award from the Ghana Chartered Institute of Marketing to the Centre for Technology-Driven Economic Development (CTED).
 Recognition award from the civil service of Ghana for meritorious services rendered to the Ghana Civil Service and the people of Ghana, 1998.
 St Luke's Day award from the Sr. Michael and All Saints Anglican Church Korle Gonno, Accra, Ghana for distinguished service as a medical doctor in the service of the Lord, 1993.
 Nobles International Award in recognition of status as an eminent West African who believes in Honesty, Integrity and Accountability, 28 November 2003.
 UN Volunteers Certificate of appreciation in recognition of voluntary contribution to national development, International Voluntary Day, 5 December 2005.
 Asante of Honour Award presented by Otumfuo, Asantehene, 25 November 2005.
 Personality of the year award 2004, by the People of the Western Region of Ghana for outstanding contribution towards the Development and promotion of Ghana, Sept 2005.
 Personality of the Decade, awarded by the Millennium Excellence Foundation 2005.
 Legend of the Year, awarded at the 2017 People's Choice Practitioners Honours organised by Media Men Ghana.

Personal life
Frimpong-Boateng and his wife, Agnes, have five children, one of whom is a promising athlete.

Frimpong-Boateng is a farmer. He established the first ostrich farm in Ghana, in the village of Dedukope, in the Volta Region of Ghana. He also grows jatropha and extracts the oil for the production of bio-diesel.
Frimpong-Boateng runs a CNC machine tool centre that is able to produce spare parts with computer precision at the Free Zones enclave in the port city of Tema.

He is a Christian. He has said that his work on the foundation of the National Cardiothoracic Centre was God's purpose in his life, and has declared that Ghana needs a "God-fearing" man to lead the country. He has quoted Albert Einstein saying: "I want to know God's thoughts; the rest are details." In 2011, in his 60s, he considered himself still a strong man "by God’s grace."

Publications 
 
 Frimpong-Boateng, Kwabena, Samuel K. Owusu, J. O. M. Pobee (2006), Medicine, Ghana Academy of Arts and Sciences. ; 9789964969202
 Frimpong-Boateng, Kwabena (2015), "Taming a Monster".

References and notes

External links
 Personal website of Kwabena Frimpong-Boateng
 Norimitsu Onishi, "Accra Journal; A Mender of Hearts Finds Fulfillment at Home", The New York Times, 5 August 1999.
 Cardiopulmonary bypass in sickle cell anaemia without exchange transfusion
Prof Kwabena Frimpong-Boateng Video Interviews 

Living people
Ghanaian Christians
University of Ghana alumni
Academic staff of the University of Ghana
1950 births
Ghanaian thoracic surgeons
Ghanaian cardiac surgeons
Ghanaian healthcare chief executives
Sekondi College alumni
Academic staff of the University of Ghana Medical School
Fellows of the Ghana Academy of Arts and Sciences